was a Japanese samurai and head of the Tamura clan. Tamura clan was a daimyō ruled part of Mutsu. Kiyoaki inherited the headship of the Tamura clan around 1571.
His daughter Lady Tamura married Date Masamune.

References

Samurai
Daimyo
1545 births
1586 deaths